Sir is a Palestinian town in the Jenin Governorate in the western area of the West Bank, located 18 kilometers south of Jenin. According to the Palestinian Central Bureau of Statistics, the town had a population of 769 inhabitants in mid-year 2006.

Location
Sir is located on the southern part of Marj Sanur, together with Meithalun.

History

SWP noted: "The ruin west of the village has the appearance of an ancient site. Foundations, cisterns cut in the rock, and heaps of stones among bushes."

Pottery sherds from the Persian, early and late Roman, and Byzantine eras have been found here.

Sir is identified with Kfar Zir, mentioned in the 6th-7th century Mosaic of Reḥob as a Jewish village in the region of Sebastia inhabited mostly by non-Jews and, therefore, agricultural produce obtained from the area could be taken by Jews without the normal restrictions imposed during the Sabbatical years, or the need for tithing.

A Crusader estate named Casale Syrorum, whose rights were affirmed in the year 1165/1166 CE by Amalric of Jerusalem, was  located here.

Ottoman era
Sir, like the rest of Palestine, was incorporated into the Ottoman Empire in 1517, and in the  census of 1596 it was a part of the nahiya ("subdistrict") of  Jabal Sami which was under the administration of the Nablus Sanjak.  The village had a population of 31 households and 4 bachelors, all Muslim. The villagers  paid a fixed tax-rate of 33,3% on agricultural products, such as  wheat, barley, summer crops, olive trees, beehives and/or goats, in addition to occasional revenues, a tax for people of liwa Nablus,  and a press for olive oil or grape syrup; a total of 7,832  akçe.

In 1870, Victor Guérin noted it as a small village on a high hill. There were many cisterns and tombs cut out from the rock, which convinced Guérin that the place was ancient. The inhabitant, which numbered 150, had a mosque.

In 1882, the PEF's Survey of Western Palestine (SWP) described Sir as: "A small village on a knoll amid brushwood, with a large house on the west."

British Mandate era
In the  1922 census of Palestine, conducted by the British Mandate authorities,  Sir had 194 Muslims inhabitants,   increasing  in the 1931 census to 233; 2 Christians and 231 Muslims, in a total of 42 houses.

In the 1945 statistics the population of Sir was 290, all Muslims,  with 12,499 dunams of land, according to an official land and population survey. Of this, 1,908  dunams were used for plantations and irrigable land, 6,045  dunams for cereals,  while 10 dunams were built-up (urban) land and 4,536 dunams were classified as "non-cultivable".

Jordanian era
In the wake of the 1948 Arab–Israeli War, and after the 1949 Armistice Agreements, Sir came under Jordanian rule.

The Jordanian census of 1961 found 470 inhabitants.

Post-1967
Since the Six-Day War in 1967, Sir has been under Israeli occupation.

References

Bibliography

External links
Welcome To Sir
Sir, Welcome to Palestine
Survey of Western Palestine, Map 12: IAA, Wikimedia commons

Jenin Governorate
Villages in the West Bank
Municipalities of the State of Palestine
Ancient Jewish settlements of Samaria